Michel Dernies (born 6 January 1961) is a Belgian former racing cyclist, who rode in twelve Grand Tours between 1985 and 1994. He currently works as a directeur sportif for UCI Continental team .

Major results

1983
1st Stage 2 Tour Européen Lorraine-Alsace
3rd Road race, National Road Championships
1985
3rd Binche-Tournai-Binche
1986
2nd Grand Prix de Wallonie
1988
1st Rund um den Henninger Turm
2nd Liège–Bastogne–Liège
1990
1st  Overall Tour of Britain
1st Stage 3 
1st Stage 4 Tour de Romandie
2nd Grand Prix de Wallonie
2nd Paris–Brussels
3rd Grand Prix de Momignies
5th Overall Route du Sud
1st Stage 1
6th Wincanton Classic
8th Tour du Nord-Ouest
1991
1st Binche-Tournai-Binche

Grand Tour general classification results timeline

References

External links
 

1961 births
Living people
Belgian male cyclists
People from Nivelles
Cyclists from Walloon Brabant
Directeur sportifs